The 44th Bodil Awards took place in Imperial in Copenhagen.

Two additional awards were given to two foreign films Dekalog by Krzysztof Kieślowski and GoodFellas by Martin Scorsese.

Winners and nominees

Best Actor in a Leading Role 
Tommy Kenter – Lad isbjørnene danse

Best Actress in a Leading Role 
Trine Dyrholm – Springflod

Best Actor in a Supporting Role 
Steen Svare – Sirup

Best Actress in a Supporting Role 
Jannie Faurschou – Springflod

Best European Film 
Dekalog

Best non-European Film 
GoodFellas

References 

1990 film awards
1991 in Danish cinema
Bodil Awards ceremonies
1990s in Copenhagen
March 1991 events in Europe